Hägglund is a Swedish surname. Notable people with the surname include:

Alvar Hägglund, Swedish cross-country skier
Bengt Hägglund, Swedish theologian
Göran Hägglund, Swedish politician
Gustav Hägglund, Finnish general
Joel Emmanuel Hägglund, birth name of Swedish-born American labor organiser Joe Hill
Jenna Hagglund (born 1989), American volleyball player 
Jöran Hägglund, Swedish politician
Martin Hägglund, Swedish literary theorist and philosopher
Roger Hägglund, Swedish hockey player
Woldemar Hägglund, Finnish general

See also
 Land Systems Hägglunds AB, Swedish defence firm merged into BAE Systems AB
Haglund

Swedish-language surnames